The Anglican Church of St Mary in Swainswick within the English county of Somerset dates from the 12th century. It is a Grade II* listed building.

Vestiges of the original 12th-century building can still be seen around the doorway in the south wall. However, much of the fabric is from the 14th century, when the three stage square tower and porch were added. Various alterations were made over the centuries, and a major Victorian restoration, by Charles Edward Davis, included rebuilding of the chancel.

The church contains monuments to the parents of William Prynne, the Puritan parliamentarian, who was born in the village in 1600. There is a ledger slab of John Wood the Elder, architect of Georgian Bath. In the nave is the Royal coat of arms of Charles I.

The parish is part of the benefice of Swainswick with Woolley within the Diocese of Bath and Wells.

References

External links
 St. Mary the Virgin, Swainswick, Bath
 

Grade II* listed buildings in Bath and North East Somerset
Buildings and structures completed in the 12th century
Grade II* listed churches in Somerset